San Remigio, officially called the Municipality of San Remigio,  is a 3rd class municipality in the province of Cebu, Philippines. According to the 2020 census, it has a population of 65,744 people.

San Remigio is bordered to the north by Medellin, to the west is Tañon Strait then Bantayan Island, to the east is the City of Bogo and the town of Tabogon, and to the south is Tabuelan.

San Remigio celebrates its annual fiesta on 15 and 16 May in honor of their patron saints, St. Isidore the Farmer and St. John Nepomucene. The parish, which was founded in 1864, celebrated its 150th anniversary in May 2014.

History

San Remigio was formerly known as "Kanghagas", a kind of tree that grew in abundance in the area. When the Spanish conquistadores arrived, they identified a town site by clearing the kanghagas trees. At the time, Kanghagas was part of barangay Punta.

Initially, the chapel of ease (visita) of Kanghagas was within the jurisdiction of Bantayan. In 1850, the town of Bogo established a parish and took over civil governance of the three barrios of Kanghagas, Lambusan, and Victoria (formerly Maarat).  Later, barangay Kanghagas was renamed Isabel after the queen of Spain, but was eventually changed in 1863 to its new and permanent name, San Remigio. The name San Remigio can be found in Florence, Italy called Church of San Remigio, a church building that was built in the 1100s and later rebuilt in the 1300s. In 1864, San Remigio and other barrios established their own parish, San Juan Nepomuceno Parish.

Geography

Barangays
San Remigio comprises 27 barangays:

Climate

Demographics

Economy

Tourism
San Remigio has the longest shoreline of any municipality in Cebu. There are several beach resorts, as well as public beaches with long stretches of white sand and warm ocean.  Beach Resorts in San Remigio include Casa Del Mar Beach Resort, Elegant Beach Resort, San Remigio Beach Club, and Hagnaya Beach Resort.

One significant destination in San Remigio is the Replica de Capelinha de Fatima located in Barangay Tacup, 13 kilometers drive from the Poblacion. The first replica in Asia and only in the Philippines.

Today, San Remigio has become a swimming and diving destination. There are a few marine sanctuaries, with new dive sites being developed. A PADI dive shop in San Remigio Beach Club caters to beginner and experienced divers who want to enjoy San Remigio's marine life.

The port of Hagnaya offers a frequent ferry service to Santa Fe and Bantayan Island as well as Masbate (particularly Cawayan and Placer).

Education

The town of San Remigio has many public and private elementary and secondary schools.

Churches

Notable events 

Archaeological excavation in 2012 by archaeologist Jojo Bersales and his team. With permission from the archdiocese of Cebu and other authorities, his team conducted an excavation and unearthed a burial site that is believed to date back in the 1500s. Alongside human skeletons were carinated pots. These pots with flat designs and rounded base were a sign of the iron era. They were mainly intended for burial rituals and not for cooking as evidenced by their fragile design and quality. Each burial site with human remains had a carinated pot next to it. Back in the day, people believed that spirits travel through the ocean to their final resting place. These pots were filled with food for use on their travel. The archaeologists also noted that bodies were buried with their feet pointing to the ocean, affirming that ancient people believed that the final resting place was on the other side of the ocean.

References

Sources

 Ereccion de Pueblos: 1818–1887. (This contains the Spanish and original texts of the Creation of Towns: photocopied from the National Archives)
 
 

Municipalities of Cebu